Jean-Philippe Reverdot (3 October 1952 – 4 June 2020) was a French photographer.

Personal exhitions 
 1984 – Galerie Private Office, Bruxelles & Galerie Saint-Nicolas, Auxerre
 1986 – Galerie Claudine Bréguet (Mois de la Photo), Paris
 1989 – Maison des Arts, Évreux
 1990 – Centre Culturel, Vitré
 1991 – Musée Sainte-Croix, Poitiers & Artothèque, Grenoble & Institut Culturel Français, Athens
 1992 – Centre Culturel Français, Amman
 1994 – Centre Photographique Nord-Pas-de-Calais, Douchy-les-Mines
 1996 –  – Centre international de la mer, Corderie Royale, Rochefort & Galerie Jacques Barbier, Paris
 2002 – Maison européenne de la photographie

Bibliography 
 1986 – Zoo, text by Bernard Lamarche-Vadel (Marval)
 1988 – Kurna, text by René Pons (Marval)
 1990 – Territoire supposé, text by René Pons (Marval)
 1990 – Fernando Pessõa, text by Philippe Bidaine (Marval)
 1996 – L’Epreuve (Marval)
 1996 – Tumulus, texts by Jean-Loup Trassard (Le Temps qu'il fait)
 1998 – … sur la peau (Marval)
 2000 – Mise en demeure, text by Bernard Lamarche-Vadel (Filigranes)
 2002 – Bilan provisoire, text by Hubertus Von Amelunxen (Marval)
 2006 – Télévision (Marval) tirage à 200 exemplaires numérotés et signés
 2006 – Tirage limité (Marval) tiré à 1000 exemplaires seulement

Portfolios 
 1986	 – Zoo, text by Bernard Lamarche-Vadel, 10 photographs printed and signed by the author, limited edition of 15 copies
 1988 – Nus de femmes, 10 photographs printed and signed by the author, limited edition of 15 numbered copies
 2000 – Notes sur la reproduction, 17 photographs printed and signed by the author, limited edition of 5 numbered copies
 2001 – Propositions, 15 photographs printed and signed by the author, limited edition of 5 numbered copies
 2002 – Placebo, 25 photographs printed and signed by the author, limited edition of 5 numbered copies
 2003 – Fracture (degré 0), 14 photographs printed and signed by the author, limited edition of 5 numbered copies
 2004 – Vers le noir, 5 color photos and 5 black and white photos printed and signed by the author, limited edition to 5 numbered copies

Filmography 
 Interview with Bernard Lamarche-Vadel, production: Maison européenne de la photographie (30 min)

References

External links 
 Jean-Philippe Reverdot Bilan provisoire 1983–1999 Maison européenne de la photographie
 Le bouleversant bilan provisoire de Jean-Philippe Reverdot on L'Humanité (26 juin 2001)
 Jean-Philippe Reverdot on data.bnf.fr

1952 births
French photographers
20th-century photographers
21st-century photographers
2020 deaths